Audita tremendi was a papal bull issued by Pope Gregory VIII on October 29, 1187, calling for the Third Crusade.

It was issued just days after Gregory had succeeded Urban III as pope, in response to the defeat of the Kingdom of Jerusalem at the Battle of Hattin on July 4 of 1187. Jerusalem itself had fallen to Saladin on October 2 (see Siege of Jerusalem), but news of that had not yet reached Europe by the time the bull was issued at the end of the month.

As with other papal bulls, Audita tremendi takes its common title from the first few words of text, which do not necessarily make any grammatical sense on their own. The first line of the bull reads "Audita tremendi severitate judicii, quod super terram Jerusalem divina manus exercuit...", in English "On hearing with what severe and terrible judgement the land of Jerusalem has been smitten by the divine hand..." (the phrase "audita severitate" is a Latin grammatical construction known as ablative absolute).

The text follows the same format as Quantum praedecessores, the bull calling for the Second Crusade in 1145. It focuses specifically on the defeat at Hattin on 4 July 1187 and subsequent devastation of the Kingdom of Jerusalem by Saladin. It points to the sins of the Latin States as the reason for this great loss. As a result, the people of Latin Christendom must repent for their sins. The bull offered a plenary indulgence, and offered church protection for the property of those who undertook the journey; thus through this logic the bull draws the conclusion that, due to the sins of the west, Saladin was able to achieve victory in Hattin and its aftermath, and now the people of the west must repent by going on a crusade to recapture the kingdom. The Bull itself is ambiguous on any stated objective, and this is open to continued debate and interpretation.

Full Text

"Gregory, bishop, servant of the servants of God, to all Christ’s faithful who receive this letter, greeting and apostolic benediction. When we heard of the severity of the awesome judgment that the hand of God visited on the land of Jerusalem, we and our brothers were disturbed by such a great horror, afflicted by such sorrows, that we scarcely knew what to do or what we should do, save that the psalmist laments and says, ‘‘O God, the gentiles have invaded your inheritance, they have sullied your holy temple, they have laid waste Jerusalem; they have left the dead bodies of your saints as meat for the beasts of the earth and food the birds of the air . . .’’ [Ps 78:1– 2]. In fact, because of the conflict which the malice of [Christian] men has recently brought on the land by the inspiration of the devil, Saladin approached those parts with a host of armed troops. They were confronted by the king and the bishops, the Templars and the Hospitallers, the barons and the knights, with the people of the land, and with the Lord’s cross (through which from memory and faith of the suffering of Christ, who hung there and redeemed the human race, was believed to be a sure safeguard and a desired defense against the attacks of the pagans), and after the battle was joined, our side was defeated and the Lord’s cross was captured. The bishops were slaughtered, the king captured, and almost all our men were either put to the sword or taken prisoner. Very few are believed to have escaped. Also, the Templars and Hospitallers were beheaded in his [Saladin’s] presence. With the army defeated, we do not think our letter can explain how they next invaded and seized every place so that only a few remained outside their power. Still, though we use the words of the prophet: ‘‘Who will give me water for my head and a font of tears for my eyes, and I will weep night and day for the death of my people’’ [Jer 9:1], we ought not despair now and decide to mistrust and believe that God is so angry with his people that in his anger with their commission of a multitude of sins he will not quickly pardon when he is pleased by their penance and, after tears and groans, will lead them to exaltation. Indeed, whoever does not mourn at least in his heart in so great a cause for sorrow not only is ignorant of the Christian faith, which teaches us to join in all suffering, but of our very humanity. For from the magnitude of the dangers and their barbarous ferocity thirsting for the blood of Christians, and adding all their power in this cause to profane the holy and erase the name of God from that land, whoever thinks we should be silent should decide. Of course, when the prophets worked previously with total desire, later the apostles and their followers worked so that divine worship should be in that land and should spread from it to every part of the world by every means great and wonderful. God, through whom all things were made, who wished to take on flesh through his divine wisdom and his incomprehensible mercy and desired to achieve our salvation through the weakness of our flesh, hunger, thirst, the cross, death and resurrection, according to the words ‘‘And he has worked salvation in the midst of the land’’ [Ps 73:12] has himself decided to work for this end. Neither can tongue speak nor the senses understand what that land has now suffered, how much it has suffered for us and for all Christians, that we read it endured under its ancient population. Moreover, we ought not believe that these things happened because of the unjust act of the judge but rather by the iniquity of an unworthy people, since we read that at the time when the people were being converted to the Lord, ‘‘one thousand were persecuted and two were fleeing from ten thousand’’ [Dt 32:30]. On the contrary, however, the army of Sennacharib was overcome by an angelic force. But ‘‘that land also devoured its inhabitants’’ [Nm 13:33] and was not at peace for very long, nor could it restrain those who broke the law. Nor did it give teaching to those who would seek the heavenly Jerusalem, which they could not attain save through the exercise of good works and after many temptations. But they could long ago fear those things, when Arroasia [Edessa] and other land fell into the hands of the pagans [1144], and it was clearly foreseen if the people who remained had again done penance they would have pleased God whom they offended by their sins. For his anger is not quick, but he puts off the punishment, and gives time for repentance. But, finally, he does not lose his judgment in mercy, but exercises his protection for the punishment of sinners and for the surety of those to be saved. We, therefore, should heed and be concerned about the sins not only of the inhabitants of that land but also of our own and those of the whole Christian people so that what is left of that land may not be lost and their power rage in other regions. For we hear from every direction of scandals and conflicts between kings and princes, among cities, so that we lament with the prophet and are able to say: ‘‘There is no truth, no knowledge of God in the land: lying, murder and adultery abound, and blood pursues blood’’ [Hos 4:1– 2]. For this reason, everyone must understand and act accordingly, so that by atoning for our sins, we may be converted to the Lord by penance and works of piety and we may first alter in our lives the evil that we do. Then we can deal with the savagery and malice of our enemies. And, what they do not fear to try against God, we will not hesitate to do for God. Therefore, sons, consider how you came into this world and how all pass on, and thus you will pass on. Use the time for penitence and doing well insofar as it regards you, with thanks. Give yourselves, give after yourselves, because you, who cannot make even a gnat upon the land, have nothing of your own. We do not say, dismiss, but send us forth in the heavenly harvest which you have and deposit with him ‘‘upon whom the rust does not destroy, nor the worms, nor the thieves dig up and steal’’ [Mt 6:20]. Work for the recovery of that land in which for our salvation Truth has arisen from the land and did not disdain to carry the forked wood of the cross for us. Pay attention not to earthly profit and glory, but to the will of God who himself taught us to lay down our souls for our brothers. Give your riches to him, which whether willingly or unwillingly, you do not know to which greedy heirs they will be left. It is certainly not new, nor unusual, that that land is persecuted by a divine judgment that, after being beaten and corrected, it may obtain mercy. Of course, the Lord could preserve it by his will alone, but it is not for us to know why he would do this. Perhaps he wished to experience and bring to the notice of others if someone is understanding and seeking God, who having offered himself embraces the time of penance joyfully. He sacrifices himself for his brothers; though he may die young, still he accomplishes much. Heed how the Maccabees, afire with the divine zeal of the law experienced extreme dangers for the freedom of their brothers. They taught that not only riches but their persons should be sacrificed for their brothers, exhorting and saying to each other: ‘‘Gird yourselves and be powerful sons because it is better for us to die in battle than to witness the desecration of our nation and our saints’’ [1 Mc 3:58– 59] Indeed, they were subject to one law; you by the incarnation of our Lord Jesus Christ have been led to the light of truth and instructed by the many examples of the saints. You should act without trepidation and do not fear to give away earthly possessions, which will last for such a short time, for those goods we are promised that ‘‘neither eye has seen nor ear has heard nor have they entered into the heart of man’’ [1 Cor 2:9], as the Apostle says: ‘‘That the sufferings of this time are not worthy to be compared to the future glory which will be revealed in us’’ [Rom 8:18]. We promise full remission of their sins and eternal life to those who take up the labor of this journey with a contrite heart and a humble spirit and depart in penitence of their sins and with true faith. Whether they survive or die, they should know that they, after they have made a true confession, will have the relaxation of the penance imposed, by the mercy of almighty God, by the authority of the apostles Peter and Paul, and ours. Their goods, from their reception of the cross, with their families, remain under the protection of the holy Roman Church, as well as the archbishops and bishops and other prelates. They should not face any legal challenge regarding the things they possess legally when they received the cross until their return or their death is known for certain, but they should also keep legally all their goods. Also, they may not be forced to pay interest if they have a loan. They should not travel in precious clothing, and with dogs or birds, or with others that display ostentation and luxury, but in modest garb and demeanor, they should do penance rather than affect vainglory. Dated at Ferrara on the fourth Calends of November [October 29, 1187], the sixth indiction.

References

Sources
 (contains analysis and Latin texts for the four different issues)
Audita tremendi, Latin text from the Patrologia Latina
Louise and Jonathan Riley-Smith, The Crusades: Idea and Reality, 1095-1274. Edward Arnold Publishers, 1981 (contains an English translation)

Third Crusade
1187 works
12th-century papal bulls
Documents of Pope Gregory VIII